Jaime Zapata is a partner at GMMB, a public affairs marketing firm. He was previously the Deputy Assistant Secretary for Public Affairs at the U.S. Department of Labor.

He was the Reading Clerk of the U.S. House of Representatives from July 2008 to June 2009, and the first ever Hispanic in this position. he worked as a spokesman for NABE and the American Federation of Teachers.

References

1962 births
Living people
Reading Clerks of the United States House of Representatives
United States Department of Labor officials
American business executives
George Washington University School of Media and Public Affairs alumni
Walsh School of Foreign Service alumni